Errol is the debut studio album by American rapper and record producer Haleek Maul. It was released on Lex Records on February 28, 2020. The album is named for and dedicated to his late grandfather. He said: "With this project I'm working through a lot of the things I've learned since I lost him, as well as speaking on the transformation I'm undergoing as an artist and person."

Critical reception

At Metacritic, which assigns a weighted average score out of 100 to reviews from mainstream critics, the album received an average score of 68, based on 5 reviews, indicating "generally favorable reviews".

Track listing

Notes
  signifies an additional producer.

Personnel
Credits adapted from liner notes.

 Haleek Maul – vocals, additional production (7, 8, 10)
 Jah Koda – vocals (1)
 Gila – production (1, 6, 9, 12)
 Morris – production (2)
 Brandon Peralta – additional production (2), mixing
 Island Levvy – vocals (3)
 Hlmnsra – production (3)
 Chris Rose – production (4)
 Mick Jenkins – vocals (5)
 Sebastian Sartor – production (5)
 Lili Renwick – additional vocals (6)
 Sega Bodega – production (7)
 Sean Leon – vocals (8)
 Matthew Rotker-Lynn – guitar (8)
 Hudson Alexander – production (8)
 Ro Ransom – vocals (10)
 Shaayz – production (10)
 Fantom Dundeal – vocals (11)
 Pablo Melendez – production (11)
 Aron – vocals (12)
 Noel Summerville – mastering
 Ansuni Hall – cover
 Commission Studio – design

References

External links
 

2020 debut albums
Lex Records albums
Hip hop albums by American artists